Chaupal, or Choupal are Farmer and weaver caste who are mainly present in Indian state of Bihar, though they are also present in Assam, Jharkhand, Odisha and West Bengal. They are a sub-group of koli or kori caste and are designated as Schedule Caste.

Notable members 

 Kameshwar Choupal, former Member of Parliament from Darbhanga

References 

Dalit communities
Scheduled Castes of Bihar
Scheduled Castes of Jharkhand
Scheduled Castes of Assam
Scheduled Castes of West Bengal